Arbore is a commune located in Suceava County, Bukovina, northeastern Romania. It is composed of three villages: namely Arbore, Bodnăreni, and Clit.

It lies on the banks of the river Solca, whose tributary, the Saca, flows into the Solca in Arbore.

Church of Arbore
Arbore is best known for its church, dedicated to Saint John the Baptist. Its painted church was the first painted church to be included on the UNESCO World Heritage List of the Churches of Moldavia. 

The monastery and the commune are named after the boyar Luca Arbore who built the church in 1503. The construction of the church was completed in about 5 months. Its exterior paintings date from 1541 and were made by Dragoș Coman. Painting the church took about 40 years.

Conservation state of outside paintings
The outside paintings on the western wall are the most well preserved, as opposed to those on the northern facade, which suffered extensive weather-related damage. This damage arose mostly because the  church roof was plundered by marauding Cossack troops and melted in order to make bullets (the original roof was made of lead).

Church interior
Due to its more modest dimensions, the inside of the church consists of only 3 chambers: pronaos, naos and altar. The burial chamber seen in other Moldavian churches (gropniță) is merged with the pronaos. It contains the tombs of hetman Luca Arbore and his family.
 
The inside painting also includes two votive paintings, depicting hetman Arbore and his family offering the church to God through the intercession of Saint John the Baptist. The reason for having two (rather than one) votive paintings is not clear, although some speculate that they were necessary to depict all children in the boyar's numerous family (even so, some are still not included).

Natives
Gheorghe Cozorici (1933–1993), actor
Radu Mironovici (1899–1979), a founding member of the Legionary Movement

Gallery

External links

References

Communes in Suceava County
Localities in Southern Bukovina
Duchy of Bukovina